The 1917 Tamworth by-election was held on 23 February 1917.  The by-election was held due to the incumbent Conservative MP, Francis Newdegate, becoming Governor of Tasmania.  It was won by the Conservative candidate Henry Wilson-Fox who was unopposed due to a War-time electoral pact.

References

1917 in England
1917 elections in the United Kingdom
By-elections to the Parliament of the United Kingdom in Staffordshire constituencies
Unopposed by-elections to the Parliament of the United Kingdom (need citation)
20th century in Staffordshire
Politics of Tamworth, Staffordshire